Tempo de Amar (English title: A Time to Love) is a Brazilian telenovela produced and broadcast by TV Globo. It premiered on 26 September 2017, replacing Novo Mundo and concluded its run on 19 March 2018, being replaced by Orgulho e Paixão. It is created by Alcides Nogueira. The telenovela is based on the works of Rubem Fonseca and features writing collaborations by Tarcísio Lara Puiati and Bíbi Da Pieve. Adriano Melo, Teresa Lampreia and Jayme Monjardim serve as the main directors.

It stars Bruno Cabrerizo, Vitória Strada, Jayme Matarazzo, Tony Ramos, Letícia Sabatella, Regina Duarte, Henri Castelli, Marisa Orth, Bruno Ferrari, Cássio Gabus Mendes, Nívea Maria and Andreia Horta.

Plot 
The story begins in Morros Verdes, fictional city of Portugal, and tells the story of Maria Vitória and Inácio. Maria Vitória became partially orphaned when her mother died at an early age and was raised by her father, José Augusto. During a religious procession, he meets Inácio, a simple young man, who lives in the neighbouring village, and lives on temporary jobs. They start dating, but the couple split up after Inácio gets a job in Rio de Janeiro. He leaves without knowing that Maria Vitória is pregnant.

Production
During early stages of production the provisional title was Amor e Morte. The initial filming took place in Rio Grande do Sul in Serra Gaucha, also in Niterói, Rio de Janeiro.

In November 2015, Rubem Fonseca and Bia Corrêa do Lago, submitted the synopsis of a plot to the 6 pm timeslot, and was scheduled to debut the following year. In March 2016, Alcides Nogueira was reported to part ways with Bia Corrêa, after the news that she would write most of the episodes alone, but in April, the project was postponed to 2018, after Alessandra Poggi and Angela Chaves' Os Dias Eram Assim, that was to replace Novo Mundo, but that was moved to the 11 p.m. timeslot. However, in January 2017, it was announced that Tempo de Amar would replace Novo Mundo.

The original synopsis provided an approach between the years 1886 and 1888, when the abolitionist movement occurred, where historical personalities such as Joaquim Nabuco and José do Patrocínio would have contact with the characters, but not to confuse with the audience previous plot (Novo Mundo), the period history was shifted to the 1920s.

Casting
Bruna Marquezine was cast for the role of the protagonist, but left the cast to study interpretation. About 15 actresses auditioned for the protagonist; notably Giovanna Lancellotti, Laura Neiva, Marina Moschen and Sophia Abrahão. Marina Ruy Barbosa was the first to be considered for the lead role, however, she was already cast in an upcoming project by Aguinaldo Silva. Bruno Cabrerizo, a former soccer player and Vitória Strada, a gaucho model, both new to Brazilian television were cast in main roles.

Cast

Guest cast

Soundtrack

Volume 1 

Tempo de Amar Vol. 1 is the first soundtrack of the telenovela, released on 9 October 2017 by Som Livre.

Volume 2 

Tempo de Amar Vol. 2 is the second soundtrack of the telenovela, released on 12 January 2018 by Som Livre.

Reception

Ratings

References

External links
 
 

2017 telenovelas
TV Globo telenovelas
2017 Brazilian television series debuts
Brazilian telenovelas
2018 Brazilian television series endings
Portuguese-language telenovelas